Hic Dragones is a small press independent publisher based in North Manchester, UK. They publish short story anthologies, novels, and re-serialized penny dreadfuls. Hic Dragones have also held academic conferences on diverse topics such as cannibalism, monsters, true crime, Alice in Wonderland, and The Wizard of Oz.

Origins 
Hic Dragones was founded in 2010 by Hannah Kate.

Authors

Authors published in full-length book form by Hic Dragones 
 Toby Stone
 Beth Daley
 Kim Bannerman
 Hannah Kate

Full List of Titles

Novels 
 Aimee and the Bear – Toby Stone
 Blood and Water – Beth Daley
 The Tattooed Wolf – Kim Bannerman
 Psychic Spiders! – Toby Stone

Poetry 
 Variant Spelling – Hannah Kate

Anthologies 
 Wolf-Girls: Dark Tales of Teeth, Claws and Lycogyny – ed. Hannah Kate
 Impossible Spaces – ed. Hannah Kate
 Hauntings: An Anthology – ed. Hannah Kate

Penny Dreadfuls 
 Varney the Vampyre; or, the Feast of Blood
 The Mysteries of London
 Wagner, the Wehr-Wolf
 The String of Pearls; a Romance
 The Life and Adventures of Valentine Vox, the Ventriloquist
 Vileroy; or, the Horrors of Zindorf Castle
 Angelina; or, The Mystery of St. Mark's Abbey
 Clement Lorimer; or, The Book with the Iron Clasps
 The Life of Richard Palmer; Better Known as Dick Turpin
 The Mysteries of the Madhouse; or Annals of Bedlam

References

External links 
 Hic Dragones official site

Book publishing companies of England
Companies based in Manchester